The Synchronized Swimming Competition at the 2007 Pan American Games took place at the Maria Lenk Aquatic Park. Only women's events were held.

Final classification

Teams

Duets

References

2007
2007 in synchronized swimming
Events at the 2007 Pan American Games